The Tennessee State Capitol, located in Nashville, Tennessee, is the seat of government for the U.S. state of Tennessee. It serves as the home of both houses of the Tennessee General Assembly–the Tennessee House of Representatives and the Tennessee Senate–and also contains the governor's office. Designed by architect William Strickland (1788–1854) of Philadelphia and Nashville, it was built between 1845 and 1859 and is one of Nashville's most prominent examples of Greek Revival architecture. The building, one of 12 state capitols that does not have a dome, was added to the National Register of Historic Places in 1970 and named a National Historic Landmark in 1971. The tomb of James K. Polk, the 11th president of the United States, is on the capitol grounds.

Description
The Tennessee State Capitol sits atop Capitol Hill, the highest point in Downtown Nashville. It is surrounded by a number of state government buildings, including the Tennessee Supreme Court building for the Middle Tennessee Grand Division. Directly south of the capitol is Legislative Plaza, a public plaza located between a number of state office buildings. North of the capitol is Bicentennial Capitol Mall State Park, a large public park that traces the state's history and geographic features. 

The Tennessee State Capitol is modeled off of an Ionic temple, incorporating Greek Revival architecture, and is composed of limestone quarried from nearby. The north and south porticoes each contain eight Ionic columns, and the east and west porticoes, which do not span the entire length of the structure, contain six. All of the columns are capped by entablatures. The tower contains eight Cornithian columns.

The building contains three stories. The first floor contains the office of the Governor and other state officials, including cabinet members. The House and Senate chambers are found on the second floor, as well as a room which housed the Tennessee State Library and Archives until 1953.

History

Site history
When Tennessee was admitted to the Union on June 1, 1796, as the 16th state, Knoxville was its first capital. Over the next thirty years, the seat of government alternated between Kingston, Nashville, Knoxville, and Murfreesboro, before being moved to Nashville in 1826. The 1835 state constitution mandated that the General Assembly choose a permanent capital. In 1843, Nashville was chosen as the capital.

The prominent Nashville hilltop site of what is now the Tennessee State Capitol was formerly occupied by the Holy Rosary Cathedral (no longer extant), the first Roman Catholic cathedral church in Nashville (with the Diocese of Nashville at that time once comprising the entire territory of the State of Tennessee). The property was purchased by the city of Nashville for $30,000, and conveyed to the state government for $1.

Design and construction

The State Capitol was designed by renowned Philadelphia architect William Strickland, who modeled it after a Greek Ionic temple. The prominent lantern structure located above the roof line of the Tennessee state capitol is a design based upon the Choragic Monument of Lysicrates in Athens that honors the Greek god Dionysus doing battle with Tyrrhenian pirates. The cornerstone of the Tennessee state capitol was itself laid on July 4, 1845 and the building was completed fourteen years later in 1859. Its final cost was approximately $900,000.

The American Society of Civil Engineers has designated the building as a National Historic Civil Engineering Landmark in recognition of its innovative construction, which made unusually extensive use of stone and was an early example of the use of structural iron. Some interior columns were built from single pieces of stone, requiring massive wooden derricks to hoist them into place. Wrought iron, instead of wood, was used for the roof trusses to reduce the building's vulnerability to fire.

Commercial, convict, and slave labor were used in the project. Fifteen enslaved Black men worked on carving the Capitol's limestone cellar from 1845 to 1847; Nashville stonemason A.G. Payne was paid $18 a month for their labor. It is believed to be "the most significant project where the [Tennessee] state government rented slave labor".

Strickland died five years before the building's completion and was entombed in its northeast wall. His son, F. W. Strickland, supervised completion of the structure. William Strickland also designed the St. Mary's Cathedral (located along the base of the capitol hill), as well as Downtown Presbyterian church located just a few blocks away from the state capitol.

Samuel Dold Morgan (1798–1880), chairman of the State Building Commission overseeing the construction of the Tennessee State Capitol, is entombed in the southeast corner near the south entrance.

Monuments
Monuments on the Capitol grounds include statues of two of the three Tennessee residents who served as President of the United States: Andrew Jackson is represented by Andrew Jackson by Clark Mills, and Andrew Johnson by a statue by sculptor Jim Gray. The second President from Tennessee, James K. Polk, is buried in a tomb on the grounds, together with his wife, Sarah Childress Polk. Other monuments on the grounds include the Sgt. Alvin C. York Memorial by Felix de Weldon, the Tennessee Holocaust Commission Memorial, the Sam Davis Memorial at the southwest corner of the Capitol grounds, and the Memorial to Africans during the Middle Passage at the southwest corner of Capitol grounds. The Charles Warterfield Reliquary is a group of broken limestone columns and fragments removed and saved from the State Capitol during the mid-1950s restoration, located near the northern belvedere on Capitol Drive. In 1957, the Capitol building was struck by an F2 tornado.

On May 30, 2020, the Sen. Edward Ward Carmack Memorial located above the Motlow Tunnel near the south entrance was toppled by protestors during a demonstration in response to the police murder of George Floyd. During the Nashville Autonomous Zone the area near where the statue stood has been unofficially claimed by protesters as "Ida B. Wells Plaza", after the anti-lynching advocate whose death had been advocated by Carmack.

The building housed a bust of Nathan Bedford Forrest between 1978 and 2021. This bust resulted from legislation introduced by Democratic state senator and Sons of Confederate Veterans member Douglas Henry in 1973, and its presence was controversial since its dedication. Legislation was proposed in 2017 towards moving it to the Tennessee State Museum. The Tennessee Historical Commission voted 25-1 on March 9, 2021, to move the bust to a museum as soon as possible. The bust was removed on July 23, 2021, and was relocated to the Tennessee State Museum three days later.

See also
List of National Historic Landmarks in Tennessee
National Register of Historic Places listings in Davidson County, Tennessee

References

External links

Tennessee State Museum - State Capitol information
Tennessee Legislature Website
Documentary: Tennessee State Capitol - Grounded in Tradition

Government buildings completed in 1859
State capitols in the United States
Government of Tennessee
National Historic Landmarks in Tennessee
Buildings and structures in Nashville, Tennessee
Greek Revival architecture in Tennessee
Historic Civil Engineering Landmarks
Government buildings in Tennessee
Tourist attractions in Nashville, Tennessee
Government buildings on the National Register of Historic Places in Tennessee
National Register of Historic Places in Nashville, Tennessee
James K. Polk
Statues of Andrew Jackson
Tombs of presidents of the United States